The following lists events that happened during 1997 in Australia.

Incumbents

Monarch — Elizabeth II
Governor-General — Sir William Deane
Prime Minister — John Howard
Deputy Prime Minister — Tim Fischer
 Opposition Leader — Kim Beazley
Chief Justice — Sir Gerard Brennan

State and Territory Leaders
Premier of New South Wales — Bob Carr
Opposition Leader — Peter Collins
Premier of Queensland — Bob Borbidge
Opposition Leader — Peter Beattie
Premier of South Australia — John Olsen
Opposition Leader — Mike Rann
Premier of Tasmania — Tony Rundle
Opposition Leader — Michael Field (until 14 April), then Jim Bacon
Premier of Victoria — Jeff Kennett
Opposition Leader — John Brumby
Premier of Western Australia — Richard Court
Opposition Leader — Geoff Gallop
Chief Minister of the Australian Capital Territory — Kate Carnell
Opposition Leader — Andrew Whitecross (until 19 August), then Wayne Berry
Chief Minister of the Northern Territory — Shane Stone
Opposition Leader — Maggie Hickey
Head of Government/Chief Minister of Norfolk Island — Michael King (until 5 May), then George Smith

Governors and Administrators
Governor of New South Wales — Gordon Samuels
Governor of Queensland — Leneen Forde (until 29 July), then Peter Arnison
Governor of South Australia — Sir Eric Neal
Governor of Tasmania — Sir Guy Green
Governor of Victoria — Richard McGarvie (until 23 April), then Sir James Gobbo
Governor of Western Australia — Michael Jeffery
Administrator of the Australian Indian Ocean Territories — Ronald Harvey (from 1 October)
Administrator of Norfolk Island — Alan Kerr (until 30 June), then Ralph Condon (until 3 August), then Tony Messner
Administrator of the Northern Territory — Austin Asche (until 17 February), then Neil Conn

Events

January
9 January — HMAS Adelaide rescues British yachtsman, Tony Bullimore, from the Southern Ocean, after his boat, Exide Challenger, capsized three days before.
20 January — Prime Minister John Howard calls a meeting of State Premiers to discuss the implications of the High Court's Wik judgment.
26 January — Nobel Prize winner Peter Doherty is named Australian of the Year.

February
4 February — Prime Minister John Howard wins Parliamentary support for a constitutional convention on the republic.
9 February — Prime Minister John Howard announces that unemployed 16 to 20-year-olds will be forced to work up to 20 hours a week on community-based projects in trial work-for-the-dole schemes.  Participants will be paid award rates and will be obliged to work only the number of hours that equate to their dole payment.
10 February — Prime Minister John Howard convenes meetings between miners, farmers and Aboriginal leaders, to discuss the Wik native title issue. Howard also reveals the details of the Government's Work for the Dole plan.
11 February — Prime Minister John Howard admits he approved a requested pay rise for one of Labor defector Mal Colston's staff shortly before last year's crucial Senate vote on the partial sale of Telstra.
14 February — Arnott's Biscuits begins withdrawing its biscuits from supermarket shelves as authorities issue a health alert over an extortionist's poison threat.  A pesticide strong enough to kill a small child had been found in some of the biscuits.
22 February — Reflecting on his first year in office, Prime Minister John Howard talks of a "10-year leadership transition" and said that "while my health lasts and I've got my marbles and I'm delivering good leadership and political success, you stay.  But when that changes, you don't".
23 February — Federal Independent Senator Mal Colston denies new allegations that he had rorted his parliamentary expenses, saying the claims by a former employee were "malicious".
25 February — The Minister for Administrative Services, David Jull, announces a departmental investigation into Independent Senator Mal Colston's use of chauffeur-driven Commonwealth cars and warns he would have no hesitation referring the matter to police.
26 February — Arnott's Biscuits restocks Queensland supermarket shelves with its biscuits three weeks after it was rocked by an extortion threat. The threat has cost the company at least $10 million.

March
6 March — In Cairns, Paul Streeton is sentenced to life imprisonment for setting fire to school boy Tjandamurra O'Shane.
24 March — 
Senator Mal Colston admits he's guilty of claiming an extra $7,000 for travel expenses, but blames sloppy book-keeping.
A conscience vote by the Senate overturns the Northern Territory's controversial voluntary euthanasia legislation, The Rights of the Terminally Ill Act.
26 March — Prime Minister John Howard announces plans for a constitutional convention in Canberra to consider the republic issue.
29 March — Prime Minister John Howard arrives in Shanghai, China to promote trade relations.
31 March — Prime Minister John Howard meets Chinese Premier Li Peng in Beijing and proposes a strategic relationship that focuses on trade, with regular military consultation and a human rights dialogue to manage differences between the two countries.

April
2 April — Governor-General Sir William Deane urges action to address the widening gap in health between indigenous and non-indigenous Australians.
8 April — 
Prime Minister John Howard refers travel rort allegations against Senator Mal Colston to the Australian Federal Police and calls on his to stand down as Deputy President of the Senate.  Liberal Senator Bob Woods and National Party backbencher Michael Cobb are also under investigation for allegedly rorting parliamentary expenses.
New South Wales Premier Bob Carr announces plans to abolish or amend the law which allows diminished responsibility to be used as a legal defence.
9 April — Senator Mal Colston agrees to stand down as Senate Deputy President but refuses to resign from Parliament.
11 April — Pauline Hanson launches the One Nation party in Ipswich, Queensland.
14 April — Prime Minister John Howard announces that the Government will no longer accept the vote of Senator Mal Colston.
17 April — The Charter of Budget Honesty Act becomes law, setting a framework for sound fiscal management and informing the public about public finances.
21 April — Former West Australian Premier Carmen Lawrence is charged with perjury over her evidence to the 1995 Easton Royal Commission.
29 April — BHP announces it will end steel-making operations in Newcastle in 1999, with 2,500 job losses.
30 April — Prime Minister John Howard speaks on Radio 3AW about Pauline Hanson saying that she is "articulating the fears and concerns and the sense of insecurity that many Australian feel at a time of change and instability.  Now it's easy to sort of finger the fact that people feel uneasy and unhappy.  The next step is to say, 'Okay, you've fingered the uncertainty.  What are you going to do about it?'"

May
1 May — 
Tasmania becomes the last state in Australia to decriminalise homosexuality.
Melbourne's HM Prison Pentridge is closed.
Foreign Affairs Minister Alexander Downer uses the launch of Asialine, a magazine for Australian business in Asia, to make a strong attack on Pauline Hanson, saying her views are offensive to people of all backgrounds.  "Those views promote an insular Australia separate from the region.  This is the concept of a little Australia: inward looking, narrow-minded, protectionist and disconnected from our own neighbourhood," he says.
5 May — 
The position of Chief Minister of Norfolk Island is restored.
Independent Federal MP Pauline Hanson launches her One Nation political party.
Prime Minister John Howard holds his first meeting with German Chancellor Helmut Kohl.
6 May — 
Mal Colston resigns as Deputy President of the Senate.
Prime Minister John Howard appeals for an end to protests against Pauline Hanson.
Kerry Whelan disappeared.
8 May — 
Melbourne's Crown Casino is opened by Victorian Premier Jeff Kennett.
Nine months after Pauline Hanson's maiden speech, Prime Minister John Howard directly attacks her views for the first time saying, "she is wrong when she suggests that Aboriginals are not disadvantaged.  She is wrong when she says that Australia is in danger of being swamped by Asians.  She is wrong to seek scapegoats for society's problems.  She is wrong when she denigrates foreign investment, because it withdrawal would cost jobs.  She is wrong when she claims Australia is headed for civil war".
13 May — Federal Treasurer Peter Costello delivers his second Federal Budget, which delivers a tax rebate of up to $450 per year on savings and a $1 billion Federation Fund for construction.
15 May — The Industrial Relations Commission signals the end of the traditional award system by rejecting an industry-wide claim for a wage rise.
20 May — The Human Rights & Equal Opportunities Commission releases a 689-page report entitled, Bringing Them Home, which states that Australian governments must apologise and pay compensation for the forced removal of Aboriginal and Torres Strait Islander children from their families.  The report concludes that successive government policies of forced removal of children constitutes a crime against humanity which amounted to "genocide".  It recommends a national compensation fund be established by the Commonwealth and states, as well as a national "sorry day" be held each year.
21 May — The Federal Government announces further cuts to immigration, halving the family reunion programme and increasing skilled migration, saying cuts are linked to high unemployment.
26 May — Prime Minister John Howard tables the Bringing Them Home report, saying that "personally, I feel deep sorrow for those of my fellow Australians who suffered injustices under the practices of past generations towards indigenous people...[but] Australians of this generation should not be required to accept guilt and blame for past actions and policies over which they had no control."  At the Reconciliation Convention in Melbourne, some Aboriginals turn their backs on the Prime Minister.
30 May — Prime Minister John Howard releases a ten-point plan in response to the High Court of Australia's historic Wik decision last December which recognised that native title and pastoral leases can co-exist.  Key points of the plan include the permanent extinguishment of native title on freehold, exclusive-tenure leases, agricultural leases deemed to confer exclusive title and where rights are inconsistent with those of pastoralists; the removal of the right of native title-holders to negotiate over mining exploration and the imposition of a six-year unset clause to register statutory native title claims.

June
5 June — Prime Minister John Howard bows to pressure from the car industry to accept a four-year freeze on car tariffs from 2000 to 2004.
15 June — 14-month-old Jaidyn Leskie disappears from a house in Moe, Victoria.
21 June — Prime Minister John Howard briefs the Queen on his plans to deal with the republic issue.
24 June — Prime Minister John Howard describes Australia as a racially tolerant nation in the Sir Robert Menzies Memorial Lecture in London.
26 June — Prime Minister John Howard arrives in Washington and is met by US Ambassador Andrew Peacock. Howard meets with President Bill Clinton on 27 June.

July
1 July — 
The telecommunications market is deregulated, allowing the entry of competitors other than Telstra and Optus.
When Britain hands back Hong Kong to China, Prime Minister John Howard warns China that it must keep its promise to maintain Hong Kong's freedom and autonomy.
13 July — A crowd of over 100,000 people watches the Royal Canberra Hospital implosion. A 12-year-old girl, Katie Bender, is killed instantly and nine others are injured when debris from the site travels across Lake Burley Griffin.
15 July — 
Senator Mal Colston and former West Australian Liberal MP Noel Crichton-Browne are charged with fraud.
Two Australians are killed when a temporary wooden bridge collapses into a shallow creek at the Maccabiah Games near Tel Aviv, Israel.
17 July — Frank Gilford waives his right to call for the death penalty of two British nurses charged with the murder of his sister Yvonne in Saudi Arabia.
21 July — Former West Australian Premier Dr Carmen Lawrence pleads not guilty to giving false evidence to the Marks Royal Commission.
23 July — Queensland Premier Rob Borbidge criticises cuts by the Federal Government to drought relief funds.
24 July — The West Australian Court of Criminal Appeal quashes seven convictions against former West Australian Premier Brian Burke.
30 July — 
The Thredbo landslide occurs, killing 17 people.
New South Wales Premier Bob Carr announces that New South Wales Police will employ Korean police and intelligence officers to help crack down on organised crime gangs as investigations continue into Korean loan-shark operations at Sydney Harbour Casino.

August
2 August — Stuart Diver, a ski instructor, is rescued as the sole survivor of the Thredbo landslide.
12 August — Victorian Premier Jeff Kennett is under fire for spending over $5,000 on a helicopter trip.
18 August — Aboriginal activist Burnum Burnum dies at his Woronora, Sydney home.  He is particularly remembered for claiming Britain on behalf of the Aboriginal people on Australia Day 1988, while Australia celebrated its bi-centennial.
28 August — Pauline Hanson sues the Australian Broadcasting Corporation for playing a new song lampooning her.
29 August — 
Queensland Premier Rob Borbidge denies allegations that a senior member of his government frequented a male brothel.
Telstra to cut another 15,000 jobs over the next three years after it revealed a big slump in profits.
30 August — Elections in the Northern Territory re-elect the Country Liberal Party government of Shane Stone.
31 August — 
The head of Yagan, a Noongar warrior, is repatriated to Australia 164 years after being taken to the United Kingdom.
Prime Minister John Howard announces the 36 names of Australians appointed to the Constitutional Convention that will discuss Australia becoming a republic.

September
1 September — Federal Cabinet shelves plans to alter cross-media ownership laws.
2 September — Victorian Premier Jeff Kennett ridicules Federal Cabinet's indecision on media ownership laws.  The Federal Opposition uses this to help show that the Prime Minister is weak.
3 September — Waterfront unions and the ACTU warn the Federal Government of widespread industrial action if the Government continues its method of reforming work conditions at seaports.
8 September — New South Wales Premier Bob Carr opens a world-class cancer research institute in Camperdown, Sydney.
11 September — BHP announces plans to cut over 800 jobs from coal mines in the Illawarra.
14 September — Prime Minister John Howard announces a $5 million rescue package for farmers.
30 September — The guns buyback amnesty expires with owners of restricted weapons now facing fines.

October
4 October — The New South Wales Labor Party Conference delegates reject Premier Bob Carr's planned sell-off of the State's electricity assets.  Carr is the first Labor Premier in fifty years to suffer a defeat at a State Party Conference.
11 October — A state election is held in South Australia. The Liberal/National coalition government of John Olsen is re-elected, albeit with a substantially reduced minority.
15 October — Cheryl Kernot, leader of the Australian Democrats, defects to the Australian Labor Party.
29 October — Prime Minister John Howard has meetings in Malaysia and in Indonesia, with President Suharto, about the Asian currency crisis.

November
2 November — Prime Minister John Howard launches the Federal Government's anti-drug campaign.
5 November — Postcard bandit Brenden Abbott and three others escape from Brisbane Correctional Centre at Wacol, Brisbane.
13 November — Postcard bandit Brendan Abbott carries out a robbery on a Gold Coast Commonwealth Bank.
14 November — 
Sydney is awarded the 2002 Gay Games and Cultural Festival.
Arnott's Biscuits shareholders overwhelmingly approve a takeover bid from American conglomerate Campbell's.
15 November — Two men are charged over the abductions and murder of Bega schoolgirls Lauren Barry and Nichole Collins.
17 November — Telstra shares are listed on the Australian Securities Exchange.
26 November – Sydney's Star City Casino is opened by New South Wales Premier Bob Carr.

December
 3 December
 Queensland Premier Rob Borbidge announces nearly $30 million to bail out the Queensland Ambulance Service, but unions say it is not enough.
 The first of the Federal Government's Work for the Dole schemes begins in Sydney.
 9 December — The Australian Banking Association doubles the bounty on the head of bank robber Brendan Abbott
 19 December — Postcard bandit Brendan Abbott robs the Yirrigan Drive branch of the Commonwealth Bank in Perth, disguised as a businessman in a grey wig and a false moustache and brandishing a .45 Webley, stealing $300,000.
 26 December — The final figures for the nationwide guns buyback are released: 640,000 weapons were surrendered across Australia with New South Wales providing the poorest number of returns.

Arts and literature
 Mark Raphael Baker's novel The Fiftieth Gate wins the New South Wales Premier's Literary Award
 David Foster's novel The Glade within the Grove wins the Miles Franklin Award
22 September — Brisbane pop group Savage Garden wins a record 10 ARIA awards.

Film
 The Castle
 Doing Time for Patsy Cline
 Blackrock
The Wiggles Movie
24 March — Queensland-born actor Geoffrey Rush wins "Best Actor" at the 69th Academy Awards for his portrayal of pianist David Helfgott in the movie Shine.  He is the first Australian to win the Best Actor Oscar since Peter Finch in 1976 for the film Network.  Australian cinematographer John Seale wins an Oscar for his work on the film The English Patient.
3 September — The Castle, a film that cost $700,000 to make and was shot in 11 days, passes $10 million at the box office.

Television
1 July — Prime Television comes to Mildura, ending a monopoly on commercial television held by STV-8 since 1965.
11 July — Long running American-Canadian children's animated series Arthur premieres on ABC.
1 November — TCN-9 stages the first trial of digital television in the Southern Hemisphere.
20 December — American animated comedy series South Park is launched on SBS becoming the network's highest rating series to date.

Sport
27 February — First day of the Australian Track & Field Championships for the 1996–1997 season, which are held at the Olympic Park in Melbourne, Victoria. The 5,000 metres was conducted at the Nike Classic, Melbourne on 20 February. The men's decathlon event was conducted at the Hobart Grand Prix on 15–16 February 1997.
1 March — The Australian Super League competition commences with 2 matches, with the Brisbane Broncos defeating the Auckland Warriors 14–2 in Brisbane & the North Queensland Cowboys defeating the Adelaide Rams 24–16 in Townsville.
2 March — Greg Blewett and Steve Waugh bat the whole day during the first test match at Johannesburg against South Africa.
7 March — The ARL competition kicks off with the Parramatta Eels defeating the North Sydney Bears 10–8 at Parramatta Stadium.
19 May — In the one and only Super League Tri-series, New South Wales defeat Queensland 23–22 in the longest (104 minutes) & one of the most exciting games of representative rugby league ever played.
25 May — Brisbane Strikers create history by winning the NSL Grand Final, a 2–0 victory over Sydney United. The achievement was the first NSL title in their history, the first time a Queensland side had won the title, and all in front of a record crowd of 40,446 at Suncorp Stadium.
13 July — Patrick Carroll wins his second men's national marathon title, clocking 2:11:21 in Brisbane, while Susan Hobson claims her second women's title in 2:32:43.
4 August — Cathy Freeman becomes the first Australian woman to win a title at the World Athletics Championships, after her triumph in the 400 metres event in Athens in 49.77 seconds.
10 August — Australia retains the Ashes after beating England by 264 runs in the Fifth Test at Trent Bridge Nottingham.  The win gives Australia its fifth consecutive series victory, an ascendancy they've held since winning the 1989 series in England.
22 August — The Melbourne Phoenix defeat the Adelaide Thunderbirds 58–48 in the inaugural Commonwealth Bank Trophy netball grand final
7 September — Pat Rafter wins the US Open, defeating Britain's Greg Rusedski 6-3, 6-2, 4-6, 7–5 to claim Australia's first grand slam tournament title since Pat Cash won Wimbledon in 1987.
17 September — The Melbourne Storm rugby league team is founded.
20 September — The Brisbane Broncos defeat the Cronulla Sharks 26–8 at ANZ Stadium (now Elizabeth II stadium) to become premiers of the Super League (Australia) season 1997. It is the first night grand final played in rugby league.
27 September — The Adelaide Crows (19.11.125) defeat the St Kilda Saints (13.16.94) to win the 101st VFL/AFL. It is the first premiership for Adelaide & the first time the AFL flag has left Victoria since 1994.
28 September — In one of, if not the most exciting grand final ever played, the Newcastle Knights defeat minor premiers the Manly-Warringah Sea Eagles 22–16 to win the 90th NSWRL/ARL premiership. It is the first premiership for Newcastle & it was the third consecutive grand final appearance for Manly. The South Queensland Crushers finish in last position in their final season, claiming their second consecutive wooden spoon.
29 November — In what has come to be known as the Iran game, the Socceroos draw 2–2 with Iran at the Melbourne Cricket Ground after leading 2–0. The game is interrupted when spectator Peter Hore cut up Iran's goal net. Iran qualifies for the 1998 FIFA World Cup on the away goals rule.
19 December — After a series of meetings at the Sydney Football Stadium (now Aussie Stadium), the Super League war is declared over. The ARL & Super League agree to form the National Rugby League, and the Perth Reds, Hunter Mariners & South Queensland Crushers are shut down to give a 20-team competition for 1998, with the newly-founded Melbourne Storm becoming part of the unified competition that season. The NRL is to be reduced to 14 teams for 2000 after reform.

Births
 1 January — Keegan Hipgrave, rugby league player
 10 January — Blake Lawrie, rugby league player
 11 January — Cody Simpson, singer
 16 January — Jarome Luai, rugby league player
 17 January — Jack Vidgen, singer
 20 January — Rheed McCracken, athletics competitor
 22 January — Brock Lamb, rugby league player
 3 February — Mitchell Dunn, rugby league player
 11 February — Roseanne Park, singer
 15 February — Joseph Tramontana, rugby league player
 19 February — Brad Parker, rugby league player
 6 March — Daniel De Silva, footballer
 20 March — Wayde Egan, rugby league player
 11 April — Georgia Bohl, Olympic swimmer
 18 April — Siosifa Talakai, rugby league player
 27 April — Jesse Ramien, rugby league player
 11 May — Morgan Baker, actor
 13 May — Reimis Smith, rugby league player
 10 June — Fletcher O'Leary, actor
 16 June — Latrell Mitchell, rugby league player
 18 June — Cory Denniss, rugby league player
 26 June
 Jacob Elordi, actor
 Jack Murchie, rugby league player
 27 June — Felix Dean, actor
 3 July — Jordan Mailata, American football and rugby league player
 14 July — Brodie Croft, rugby league player
 21 July
 Josh Ralph, rugby league player
 Tom Wright, rugby player
 25 July — Nat Butcher, rugby league player
 2 August — Phillip Sami, rugby league player
 4 August — Sam Stone, rugby league player
 5 August — Jack Cogger, rugby league player
 17 August — Tyronne Roberts-Davis, rugby league player
 18 August — Josephine Langford, actress
 6 September — Jai Field, rugby league player
 9 September — Billy Bainbridge, rugby league player
 10 September — Nick Meaney, rugby league player
 12 October — Curtis Scott, rugby league player
 15 October — Jack Johns, rugby league player
 14 November — Nathan Cleary, rugby league player
 27 December — Gideon Gela-Mosby, rugby league player

Deaths

 17 January — Bert Kelly, South Australian politician (b. 1912)
 31 January — John Panizza, Western Australian politician (b. 1931)
 16 March — Harry Holgate, 36th Premier of Tasmania (b. 1933)
 10 April — Clinton Haines, computer hacker (b. 1976)
 21 April — Laurence Henry Hicks, military bandmaster and composer (born in the United Kingdom) (b. 1912)
 25 April — Brian May, film composer (b. 1934)
 2 May — John Carew Eccles, psychologist (died in Switzerland) (b. 1903)
 21 May — William Aston, New South Wales politician (b. 1916)
 15 June
 Jaidyn Leskie, murder victim (b. 1996)
 Dal Stivens, writer (b. 1911)
 11 July — Jock Sturrock, Olympic yachtsman (b. 1915)
 13 July — Sir Garfield Barwick, 7th Chief Justice of Australia and New South Wales politician (b. 1903)
 6 August — Lance Barnard, 3rd Deputy Prime Minister of Australia (b. 1919)
 17 August — Burnum Burnum, Indigenous activist, sportsman and actor (b. 1936)
 5 September — Brian Grieve, botanist (b. 1907)
 12 September — Archer Denness, soldier (b. 1914)
 16 September — Anne Kerr, Lady Kerr, 19th Spouse of the Governor-General of Australia and interpreter (b. 1914)
 29 October — H.C. "Nugget" Coombs, public servant and economist (b. 1906)
 5 November — Peter Jackson, rugby league footballer (b. 1964)
 6 November — Jane Thurgood-Dove, murder victim (b. 1963)
 22 November — Michael Hutchence, singer, songwriter and actor (b. 1960)

See also
 1997 in Australian television
 List of Australian films of 1997

References

 
Australia
Years of the 20th century in Australia